The 2008–09 season was the 72nd season in the existence of Toulouse FC and the club's 6th consecutive season in the top flight of French football. They participated in the Ligue 1, the Coupe de France and Coupe de la Ligue.

Players

First-team squad

Out on loan

Transfers

In

Out

Pre-season and friendlies

Competitions

Overview

Ligue 1

League table

Results summary

Results by round

Matches 

Source:

Coupe de France

Coupe de la Ligue

Statistics

Goalscorers

References

Toulouse FC seasons
Toulouse FC